Clarine E. Seymour (December 9, 1898 – April 25, 1920) was an American silent film actress.

Early life
Seymour was the eldest of two children born to Albert V. Seymour and Florence Seymour in Brooklyn, a wealthy couple who were devout Methodists. She had one younger brother. Albert Seymour ran a prosperous ribbon manufacturing business. Seymour began appearing in "entertainments" at the family's church as a child. In early 1916, Albert Seymour became ill and was forced to close his business. The family moved to New Rochelle, New York where Seymour found work at the Thanhouser Film Company as a film extra to help support her family. While at Thanhouser, she appeared in two shorts, Pots-and-Pans Peggy and It Happened to Adele. As a result of her work through that company, she obtained work through Pathé in a Pearl White serial.

Career

In 1917, Seymour appeared in Pathé's Mystery of the Double Cross opposite actress Mollie King. Hal Roach saw her performance and offered her a film contract with his Rolin Film Company. Seymour accepted and relocated to Los Angeles to perform as the leading lady in the Toto the Clown (played by Armando Novello) film comedy serials. Throughout 1918, she appeared in the Toto serial and also had a supporting role in the comedy short Just Rambling Along (1918), opposite Stan Laurel. The deal with Roach soon soured after Seymour claimed she was fired for refusing to do her own stunts. She filed suit against the company and was awarded $1,325 (approximately $ today) in damages. While the case was pending, Seymour appeared in comedy shorts for Al Christie's comedy shorts.

In 1918, Seymour met Victor Heerman. Heerman directed a screen test featuring Seymour and one of D.W. Griffith's Artcraft stock company actors Robert Harron. Griffith was pleased with the pairing and with Seymour's knack for light comedy and hired her as member of his stock company. Griffith cast Seymour with Harron, Richard Barthelmess and Carol Dempster in the drama The Girl Who Stayed at Home (1919). Although the film was not well received by critics, Seymour's performance was and the public interest in her began to grow. Later that year, she was paired with Robert Harron again in True Heart Susie (1919) which also featured Lillian Gish. Seymour followed with role in Scarlet Days (1919), also opposite Richard Barthelmess and Carol Dempster. In 1920, Griffith cast Seymour in the lead role in The Idol Dancer. The film was not well received by audiences but they were taken by Seymour's performance. Shortly after the film's release, Seymour was featured on the cover of Motion Picture Magazine.

Death
In early 1920 Griffith again cast Seymour, this time in Way Down East. Halfway through filming, on April 21, Seymour fell ill due to "intestinal strangulation". She was taken to Misericordia Hospital in New York City for treatment but her condition did not improve. She underwent emergency surgery but died after developing pneumonia on April 25, 1920. Seymour is buried in Greenwood Union Cemetery in Rye, New York.

Actress Mary Hay was cast in Seymour's role for Way Down East and her part was reshot. Footage of Seymour in long shots can be seen in the finished film. On September 26, a memorial service for Seymour, Ormer Locklear, Olive Thomas, and Robert Harron (who died of an accidental self-inflicted gunshot wound two days after the premiere of Way Down East) was held at the Robert Brunton Studios. All four had died that year and were eulogized by director William Desmond Taylor. Taylor was murdered less than 18 months later; his killer was never caught.

Filmography

Notes

References

External links

 
 

1898 births
1920 deaths
20th-century American actresses
Actresses from New York City
American film actresses
Methodists from New York (state)
American silent film actresses
Burials in New York (state)
Film serial actresses
Deaths from pneumonia in New York City
People from Brooklyn
Actresses from New Rochelle, New York